The Juno Awards of 2004 were presented on April 4, 2004, at Rexall Place in Edmonton, Alberta, Canada and were hosted by Alanis Morissette.

Singer-songwriters Nelly Furtado, Sarah McLachlan, and Nickelback led the nominations with five nominations each. Céline Dion, received four nominations; Billy Talent, Our Lady Peace and Sam Roberts each received three; Avril Lavigne, Barenaked Ladies, Christina Aguilera, Lillix, Michael Bublé, R. Murray Schafer, Shania Twain, and Tafelmusik Baroque Orchestra got two nominations each.

Producer/musician Bob Ezrin is this year's inductee into the Canadian Music Hall of Fame.  Walt Grealis, who founded in 1970 what became the Juno Awards, will posthumously receive the award that bears his name, the Walt Grealis Special Achievement Award.

People

Albums

Songs and recordings

Other

External links 
Juno Awards site, accessed August 8, 2006
CTV Press Release: Junos 2004, accessed August 8, 2006
https://junoawards.ca/awards/past-winners-nominees/?search_year_val1=1970&search_year_val2=2021&search_category_val=&search_wins_val=no&tag_search_val=3%27s+A+Crowd&submit=submit

2004
2004 music awards
2004 in Canadian music
April 2004 events in Canada
2004 in Alberta
Culture of Edmonton